Johnson Controls Hitachi AC Limited is a Japanese multinational air conditioning manufacturing company that manufactures home appliances and specialises in air conditioning and cooling technology. The company was incorporated on 1st October 2015 in Tokyo, as a Joint Venture between Jonhson Controls and Hitachi Appliances. The Chief Executive Officer of the company is Shoji Akiyama. The shares of its major subsidiary in India are traded on the Bombay Stock Exchange under symbol JCHAC.

India 
In India, Hitachi air conditioners are manufactured and marketed by Hitachi Home & Life Solutions India Ltd, which is a joint venture between Hitachi Homes and the Johnson Controls group based in Ireland. The company is headquartered in Ahmadabad, Gujarat. It has another Global Development Center in Kadi, Gujarat.

Gallery

References 

Hitachi
Johnson Controls
Heating, ventilation, and air conditioning companies
Companies listed on the National Stock Exchange of India
Companies listed on the Bombay Stock Exchange